Vaiano is a comune (municipality) in the Province of Prato in the Italian region of Tuscany.

Geography
The municipality of Vaiano contains the frazioni (subdivisions, mainly villages and hamlets) Fabio, Faltugnano, Gamberame, La Briglia, La Cartaia, La Foresta, La Tignamica, Le Fornaci, Meretto, Parmigno, Popigliano, Savignano, San Leonardo in Collina, Schignano and Sofignano.

Vaiano borders the following municipalities: Barberino di Mugello, Calenzano, Cantagallo, Montemurlo, Prato.

Demographic evolution

Architectures

Churches
San salvatore abbey in Vaiano
Chapel at the old cemetery in Vaiano
San Leonardo in Gamberame
San Leonardo in San leonardo in Collina
Chapel at the Fattoria delle Mura in Sofignano
Chapel at Villa Buonamici in San Gaudenzio
Saint Anthon oratory at Villa Vai Il Mulinaccio
San Pier Giuliano oratory in La Cartaia
Ex Church of San Leonardo in Case
San Martino in Fabio
San Martino in Schignano
San Miniato in La Briglia
San Miniato in Popigliano
Santi Andrea e Donato in Savignano
Santi Giusto e Clemente in Faltugnano
Santi Vito e Modesto in Sofignano
Santo Stefano in Parmigno

Villas
Villa vai al Mulinaccio
Villa del Bello
Villa Hall or Villa Strozzi in Meretto
Villa Buonamici in San Gaudenzio
Villa Buonamici in Savignano
Villa Fabbri Fattoria delle Mura in Sofignano

Feasts
Carnival in Vaiano February
Feast of the dust in Sofignano may
More events during the year in Villa Vai

Notable people
Teresa Meroni  (1885 – 1951), worker, trade unionist, and socialist

Gallery

References

External links

 
 Events in Prato and its province

Cities and towns in Tuscany